Gehrenseestraße is a railway station in the Lichtenberg district of Berlin. It is served by the S-Bahn line .

References

Berlin S-Bahn stations
Buildings and structures in Lichtenberg
Railway stations in Germany opened in 1984
1984 establishments in East Germany